Night Club Girl is a 1945 American comedy film directed by Edward F. Cline and written by Henry Blankfort and Dick Irving Hyland. The film stars Vivian Austin, Edward Norris, Maxie Rosenbloom, Minna Gombell, Judy Clark and Bill Dunn. The film was released on January 5, 1945, by Universal Pictures.

Plot

Cast        
Vivian Austin as Eleanor Kendall
Edward Norris as Clark Phillips
Maxie Rosenbloom as Percival J. Percival
Minna Gombell as Rita
Judy Clark as Janie
Bill Dunn as Charlie Kendall 
Leon Belasco as Gaston
Andrew Tombes as Simmons
Fred Sanborn as Fred
Clem Bevans as Mayor
Virginia Brissac as Ma Kendall
Emmett Vogan as Cass
George Davis as Carlos 
The Delta Rhythm Boys as Themselves 
Paula Drake as Singer 
The Mulcays as Themselves

References

External links
 

1945 films
American comedy films
1945 comedy films
Universal Pictures films
Films directed by Edward F. Cline
American black-and-white films
1940s English-language films
1940s American films